Philo Newton Cobblestone House is a historic home located at Hartland in Niagara County, New York.  It was built about 1830 by Philo Newton, and is a -story, cobblestone dwelling in the Greek Revival style.  Also on the property are a contributing well and chicken coop.

It was listed on the National Register of Historic Places in 2002.

References

External links
Newton, Philo Cobblestone House - Hartland, New York - U.S. National Register of Historic Places on Waymarking.com

Houses on the National Register of Historic Places in New York (state)
Houses completed in 1830
Greek Revival houses in New York (state)
Cobblestone architecture
Houses in Niagara County, New York
1830 establishments in New York (state)
National Register of Historic Places in Niagara County, New York